Košarkarsko društvo Hopsi Polzela, commonly referred to as Hopsi Polzela or simply Hopsi, is a professional basketball team based in Polzela, Slovenia. During their golden years in the 1990s they were known as Kovinotehna Savinjska Polzela. The team currently competes in the Slovenian First League.

Honours
 Slovenian League
 Runners-up: 1995, 1997, 1998
 Slovenian Cup
 Winners: 1996
 Runners-up: 1994, 1997, 2019
 Slovenian Supercup
 Runners-up: 2019
 1. B SKL
 Winners: 2007
 Runners-up: 2006

External links
Official website 
Eurobasket.com profile

Basketball teams established in 1972
Basketball teams in Slovenia
1972 establishments in Slovenia
Basketball teams in Yugoslavia